Sabulopsocidae is a family of lice in the order Psocodea. There are at least two genera and two described species in Sabulopsocidae.

Genera
These two genera belong to the family Sabulopsocidae:
 Moapsocus Schmidt & New, 2004
 Sabulopsocus Smithers, 1969

References

Further reading

 
 
 

Psocomorpha